The Department of Corrections of the state of Alaska is an agency of the state government responsible for corrections. The department manages institutions, parole and probation. The current commissioner is Jen Winkelman. The agency has its headquarters in the Douglas area of Juneau and offices in Anchorage.

History
The State of Alaska assumed jurisdiction over its corrections on January 3, 1959. Prior to statehood, the Federal Bureau of Prisons had correctional jurisdiction over Alaska.

As of 2005 Alaska kept more than 30% of its prisoners in private facilities out of state, most of them at the Florence Correctional Center in Florence, Arizona, owned and operated by Corrections Corporation of America.  These statistics left Alaska ranking #2 among states in percentage of its inmates in private prisons, and unlike New Mexico, the leader, many of the Alaskans were detainees awaiting trial.

By 2009 Alaska had moved these prisoners from Florence to CCA's Red Rock Correctional Center in Eloy, Arizona, and were moving them again, to the Hudson Correctional Facility in Hudson, Colorado, then under contract with prison operator Cornell Companies.  The opening of the new $240 million Goose Creek Correctional Center in July 2012 allowed the state to bring those prisoners back to Alaska.

Facilities

Fallen officers
Since the establishment of the Alaska Department of Corrections, 1 officer has died in the line of duty.

See also

 List of law enforcement agencies in Alaska
 List of United States state correction agencies

References

External links
 
 

 
State corrections departments of the United States
Corrections